The 2015 Telford and Wrekin Council election took place on 7 May 2015 to elect members of the Telford and Wrekin Council in England. It was held on the same day as other local elections and the UK General Election 2015.

Election result 

Labour Party lost overall control, but remained the largest party on the Council.

Ward results
Sitting councillors are marked with an asterisk (*).

Adamston & Bratton

Apley Castle

Arleston

Brookside

Church Aston & Lilleshall

College

Dawley & Aqueduct

Donnington

Dothill

Edgmond & Ercall Magna

Ercall

Hadley & Leegomery

Haygate

Horsehay & Lightmoor

Ironbridge

Ketley & Oakengates

Madeley & Sutton Hill

Malinslee & Dawley Bank

Muxton

Newport North & West

Newport South & East

Oakengates & Ketley Bank

Park

Priorslee

Shawbirch

St Georges

The Nedge

Woodside

Wrockwardine

Wrockwardine Wood & Trench

Changes since 2015 Election 

Since the 2015 election the overall control has adjusted due a number of events, resulting in Labour Party taking overall control.

 Cllr Clive Mollet died triggering 2016 by-election. Resulting in the seat changing to Labour Party.
 Cllr Connor Furnival switched from Conservative to Independent.
 Cllr Kevin Guy switched Labour Party to Liberal Democrats.
 Cllr Mark Boylan switched from Conservative to Labour Party.

By February 2019, the parties were in control of the following number of seats:

References
General

Specific

2015 English local elections
May 2015 events in the United Kingdom
2015
21st century in Shropshire